Ombudsman for Local Governments in the Indian state of Kerala is an independent quasi judicial authority which investigates the complaints against the local governments of Kerala as well as the functionaries working under them. The Ombudsman functions at the State level with its headquarters in the State's Capital. Kerala is the only State in India that has such an institution to oversee the functioning of Local Self Government Institutions. A former judge of a High Court can be appointed as Ombudsman. Local Government Ombudsman in Kerala has been modelled in the pattern of Local Government Ombudsman, United Kingdom.But it has been endowed with the powers of punishment.
Ombudsman is a Swedish word, which means citizen's defender It is essentially a Scandinavian institution through which administrative actions are overseen by an independent authority to contain abuse of discretion, mal-administration etc.

The Objectives
The objectives of Ombudsman for Local Governments are to deal with corruption and mal-administration in local governments in Kerala. Ombudsman can conduct investigation and or enquiry in respect of any action involving corruption or maladministration or irregularities in the discharge of administrative functions by Local Self Government Institutions or by an employee or an officer working under the Local Self Government Institution or by an employee or an officer working in any office or institutions transferred to such Local Self Govt. Institution or by any elected Member of the Local Self Govt. Institutions including its president or Chairperson and for the disposal of any complaint relating to such action in accordance with the provisions of the Kerala Panchayat Raj Act, 1994. The Ombudsman can look into instances of favouritism, nepotism, lack of integrity, excessive action, inaction, abuse of position, etc. on the part of officials and elected representatives of all local governments (Corporations, Municipalities, and Panchayaths of all three levels) in Kerala.

Ombudsman can even register cases suo moto if instances of the above kind come to his notice.  His sittings can be anywhere in the State and at his discretion.    He is not fully bound by the rigid provisions of the Indian Evidence Act and the Procedure Codes. Advocates can appear in the cases before the Ombudsman only if specifically permitted to do so for stated reasons. These provisions make the functioning of the Institution very flexible and enables conduct of cases fast and inexpensive. At present sittings of Ombudsman are held at Thiruvananthapuram, Ernakulam, and Kozhikode.  Occasionally sittings are also held at other places like Kannoor, Palakkad, etc. also.

A Brief history
The Institution started functioning in the year 2000 as a 7-member body with a Retd. Judge of the High Court as its Chairman.  The successor government changed the constitution and made it a single member body through an amendment of the Panchayath Raj Act in the year 2001. During the preceding 3 years the office was held by Mr. Justice T.K. Chandrasekhar Das and before that by Mr. Justice K.P. Radhakrishna Menon.  The Chairman of the 7 member body which was functional in the year 2000 was Mr. Justice P.A. Mohamed.  All of them have rendered exemplary service to the institution. With effect from 17-3-2008 the office of Ombudsman is held by Mr. Justice M.R. Hariharan Nair, a former Judge of the High Court of Kerala and his vibrancy is evident from the newspaper reports on his actions (See the inks below).   His appointment was for a term of 3 years which ended on 16-3-2011.

Justice M N Krishnan, who served as the High Court Judge from 28 October 2004 to 10 February 2011, was served the position of Ombudsman for Local Governments in Kerala from 20 April 2011 to March 2014.

Justice ML Joseph Francis former high court Judge joined as Ombudsman from 6 August 2014.

Justice KK Denesan took charge as Ombudsman from 22 December 2017.

History of complaint disposal
Total number of cases considered and disposed in the period 1 April 2003 to 31 March 2004, taken from the Annual report is given below. The annual report includes an appendix containing summary of proceedings of a few important cases handled during the year.

The total number of cases disposed on admission is 232 and hence the total number of cases disposed of during the financial year is 232 + 921 = 1151. Among these 1153 disposals, 860 cases were filed during the year and others were old cases. As well, 23 cases were referred to Vigilance and Anti- Corruption Bureau for detailed enquiry.

Second ARC hails Ombudsman system
On institutionalizing the Ombudsman system in other state, the Second Administrative Commission Report Vol 6 (page 99) on Local Governance says as follows :-

"..... there is need for institutionalising a grievance redressal mechanism which would address complaints regarding elected functionaries and officials of the local bodies. This would provide a platform to the citizens for voicing their complaints and also bring out the deficiencies in the system for suitable remedial action. With increased devolution to the local government institutions, a plethora of developmental schemes will be implemented at the grass roots level. On an average, a Panchayat could be handling a crore worth of programmes every year. Such a large size of public funds increases public expectations. It also gives rise to concerns that decentralisation without proper safeguards may increase corruption, particularly if the process is not simultaneously accompanied by the creation of suitable accountability mechanisms similar to those available at the Union and State Government levels. The Commission in its Fourth Report on "Ethics in Governance" considered this issue. It was of the view that a local body Ombudsman should be constituted for a group of districts to look into complaints of corruption and maladministration against functionaries of local bodies, both elected members and officials. For this, the term 'Public Servant' should be defined appropriately in the respective State legislations. The Ombudsman should have the authority to investigate cases and submit report to competent authorities for taking action. Such competent authorities should normally take action as recommended. In case of disagreement, reasons must be recorded in writing and be placed in the public domain. These would require amendments in the respective State Panchayat Acts and the Urban Local Bodies Acts to include provisions pertaining to the local body Ombudsman".

References

External links
 Official Website of the Ombudsman for Local Self Government, Kerala 
A Webpage on Local Government Ombudsman in Kerala
 Local Government Ombudsman, U K
 Local Government Ombudsman Watcher Site
 Governenet of Kerala Website
 Kerala Panchayat Raj Amendment Act 2001
 Waste disposal: Ombudsman flays local bodies for inaction
 New Ombudsman for local bodies

 Ombudsman threatens to take action against corporation
 New Ombudsman visits garbage plant
 .

See also
 Ombudsman
 Local Government Ombudsman

Kerala, Ombudsman
 
Local government in Kerala